Wilfred Peters (Sr.) MBE (April 15, 1931 – June 9, 2010), better known as Mista Peetaz, was and will always be the King of Brukdown Music (Brukdong Myoozik in Belize Creole) in Belize. He was a pioneer of the music of Belize's Creole (Kriol) people called Brukdown or Brukdong (in Belize Creole). His favourite instrument was the accordion and for that he can also be remembered as a Belizean accordionist. He was also a band leader and toured Europe and North America with his band, the Boom & Chime Band, which is also known as Mista Peetaz Boom and Chime Band.  Mr. Peters was also awarded an MBE by Queen Elizabeth in 1997 for his cultural contributions to the development of music.

Mr. Peters is a Belize National Icon. He was one of the country's best loved musicians and he will always be remembered. After over 60 years of playing, he defined Belizean Creole culture through his distinctive Brukdown music style.

References

External links 
 Weh Mi Lova Deh (album) at Stonetree Records (archived 2022-08-11)

1931 births
2010 deaths
Bandleaders
Belizean accordionists
Members of the Order of the British Empire